Development/For! (Latvian: Attīstībai/Par!, AP!) was a liberal political alliance in Latvia. It was formed in 2018 and was composed of Movement For! (Par), For Latvia's Development (LA) and Izaugsme.

The alliance embraced a centrist position, and was variously described as social-liberal and classical-liberal views. It is orientated towards pro-Europeanism, and it states "a modern and just Latvia within a united Europe" as its main goal. The two main components of the alliance, LA and Par, are both member parties of the Alliance of Liberals and Democrats for Europe (ALDE) party. The alliance was led by its co-chairmen, Daniels Pavļuts, member of Saeima and the leader of Par, and Juris Pūce, Minister for Environmental Protection and Regional Development and the leader of LA.

In the 2018 parliamentary election it placed fourth by winning 13 seats in Saeima. From January 2019 the alliance participated in the first Kariņš cabinet, holding seven ministerial positions including Artis Pabriks's being appointed Deputy Prime Minister. In the 2019 European Parliament election, the alliance received one of the eight seats allocated to Latvia, with the frontrunner of the list, political scientist Ivars Ijabs being elected. Ijabs was at that time not a member of any of the parties making up the alliance, although he announced that he would represent the ALDE party. Ijabs as well as deputy prime minister and defence minister Artis Pabriks joined For Latvia's Development in October 2019.

In the 2020 Riga City Council snap election, the alliance ran on a common electoral list with the centre-left Progressives, which won the election with 26 percent of the vote and received 18 seats, seven of which were won by AP! candidates from all parties except Growth.

After disappointing results from the 2022 parliamentary election, in which the alliance failed to return its parliamentary seats, the alliance was technically dissolved, though it remains registered to maintain state funding.

Members

Election results

Legislative elections

European Parliament

References

Political party alliances in Latvia
2018 establishments in Latvia
Political parties established in 2018
Political parties disestablished in 2022